Kill Kill Faster Faster is a 2008 thriller film directed by Gareth Maxwell Roberts, with the screenplay an adaptation by Gareth Maxwell Roberts and Joel Rose of Rose's novel of the same name.  The film stars Gil Bellows, Lisa Ray, Esai Morales, and Shaun Parkes, and premiered April 16, 2008, at the London Independent Film Festival.  It had its DVD release on July 28, 2009, which was followed by screening at the Helsinki International Film Festival September 18, 2009.

Background
The project is set in New York City and was filmed there and in Rotterdam, the Netherlands. The film follows the life of a former drug addict and murderer who is released from prison. Filming was completed July 2007. The film received attention due to former Bollywood actress Lisa Ray's several aesthetically shot nude scenes.

Plot
Joe One-Way (Gil Bellows) is serving a life sentence for the passion murder of his teenage bride Kimba (Moneca Delain).  At the urging of his cellmate Clinique (Shaun Parkes), he composes the play White Man: Black Hole about his crime.  Joe had been incarcerated 18 years, before Hollywood agent Markie Mark (Esai Morales), who wishes to make a film of the play, arranges that Joe gets an early release from prison. Wanting to create a great deal of media buzz, he brings Joe into his office to rewrite the stage play in order to give it greater audience appeal.  There, Joe meets Fleur (Lisa Ray), Markie's arm candy.  Learning she had been a fan of his for some time, the two begin a torrid affair.  Joe then searches for a way to reconcile the crime for which he had never forgiven himself.

Partial cast
 Gil Bellows as Joey
 Lisa Ray as Fleur
 Esai Morales as Markie
 Shaun Parkes as Clinique
 Doña Croll as Birdie
 Moneca Delain as Kimba
 Stephen Lord as Jarvis
 Jane Peachey as Serena
 Saskia Troccoli as Sasha
 Viv Weatherall as Nicky Roman
 Liza Sips as Lolita
 Godwin Logye as Dobbins
 Jason Griffith as Cassius (uncredited)
 Laurence Edney as Braman

Recognition

Critical response
Independent Film Reviews wrote that the film "had some real mixed reviews and not a lot of publicity."  The anonymous reviewer noted that the film's use of a prison theme is one that has been used many times.  He noted that while Shaun Parkes' role as Joey's cell mate was cliché, it was "enjoyable to watch", and also noted that Gil Bellows' performance was "very reminiscent of Mickey Rourke's character in Bullet".  He granted that there were some scenes that provided nice, artistic visuals, but that they could not overcome drab writing "trying to be philosophical but coming off as dribble and out of place". The reviewer offered that if a viewer did not have high expectations, it might be worth renting, but wrote "overall the theme is predictable and the story pretty much tells its ending all throughout which gives the viewer a bit of a letdown."

TV Kult makes note that the film uses the device of frequent flashbacks to maintain tension and provide context without a need to overly develop the backstory, and through the performances of the supporting cast their characters are portrayed convincingly.  The reviewer noted that while the scenes depicting Joe's 18 years of incarceration included sex and violence, they were contextually well integrated into the film without appearing overdone. While writing that the film was not great cinema, he noted that its strength lay with a story that holds a viewer's interest. In conclusion, it is "[e]in durchaus sehenswerter Film für alle Thrillerfans, die mehr Wert auf eine gute Story als auf Effekten und großen Namen legen," or "a very watchable film for all thriller fans who attach more importance to a good story than on effects and big names."

Awards and nominations
 2008, won 'Best International Feature' at London Independent Film Festival
 2008, won 'Best Editing in a HD Feature Film' at HD Fest
 2008, 2nd place, 'Best High-Definition Feature' HD Fest
 2008, won 'Best Independent Feature Film' at Charity Erotic Awards.

DVD release
The DVD extras include the original trailer and a trailer show, a photo gallery with pictures from the movie and the filming, and a one-hour interview with the director Gareth Maxwell Roberts.

References

External links
 

American independent films
Dutch independent films
2008 films
American prison films
Films set in Manhattan
Films shot in New York City
2000s thriller films
American thriller films
American romantic drama films
2008 romantic drama films
Dutch thriller films
2000s American films